Jurisics Castle, named after Croatian nobleman Nikola Jurišić is located in Kőszeg, Hungary.

Siege of Güns

During the Habsburg-Ottoman wars, Pargalı İbrahim Pasha under the command of Suleiman the Magnificent laid siege to the castle in 1532. Jurišić and less than 1,000 men defended the castle for 25 days without any artillery, despite 19 assaults.

References

 
Landmarks in Hungary
Castles in Hungary
Museums in Vas County
Buildings and structures in Vas County
Historic house museums in Hungary